Abdun-e Anjir (also Romanized as Ābdūn-e Ānjīr and Ābdūnānjīr) is a village in Pa Qaleh Rural District, in the Central District of Shahr-e Babak County, Kerman Province, Iran. At the 2006 census, its population was 12, in 5 families.

References 

Populated places in Shahr-e Babak County